Andrea Zitolo OMRI (born 1980, Pescina) is an Italian-French scientist and academic specialized in physical chemistry and material science.

Life and career 

Zitolo, who was born in the Province of L'Aquila, Abruzzo, grew up in Ladispoli, a seaside city that is currently part of the Metropolitan City of Rome Capital. After his diploma at the Liceo Scientifico Sandro Pertini, he started his studies at Sapienza University of Rome. He graduated in chemistry with a specialization in physical chemistry and top marks (110 cum laude/110). At the same university, he obtained his PhD in Chemical Sciences with a thesis on “Structural investigation of lanthanoid coordination: a combined XAS and Molecular Dynamics study” and he started his career as researcher.
Years after, he moved to Paris, to work at the Synchrotron Soleil, where he is currently employed as scientist. Italian press said he moved to France "in order to revolution the world of low-cost energy". On 2020 he obtained a Agence nationale de la recherche grant to start and coordinate “Spectroscope”, an operando X-ray Absorption Spectroscopy (XAS) study of novel non-precious metal electrocatalysts.

On 2 June 2017 the President of the Italian Republic Sergio Mattarella nominated him Knight of the Order of Merit of the Italian Republic for his contribution to the advancement of Science and in January 2018, the French Minister of Education Jean-Michel Blanquer nominated him Knight of the Ordre des Palmes Académiques.

He is also Editorial Board Member for the Springer Nature Group.

Recent scientific works 

His pioneering research interest focuses on the application of x ray absorption spectroscopy in understanding the structure and properties of fuel cell catalysts.

Since 2020 he is external review panel member at DESY in Germany and at Paul Scherrer Institut in Switzerland.

Activism and Philanthropy 

On 2016, among other Italian celebrities, he served as Testimonial for the World Water Day campaign of the Green Cross, advocating on the need of saving and protecting natural resources such as Water and showing their importance for the advancement of Science.

Sensitive to the issues related to the transformation of the Higher-Education System and Research, consequently affecting the evolution of young researchers' career in STEM, he highlights the need of bridging the gap between institutions and investigators to answer to the new claims and needs of young scientists.

References 

1980 births
Living people
People from the Province of L'Aquila
Italian physical chemists
Sapienza University of Rome alumni